was a Japanese basketball Head coach for the Akita Isuzu Motors, Isuzu Motors Lynx/Giga Cats and Yokohama Giga Cats. He was known as the “Godfather of Japanese basketball,”  and served as head coach of the Japan national basketball team three times. Growing up in Akita during WWII as a young boy, he was told to stop playing basketball because it was an American sport. The pioneer studied basketball coaching at the University of Kentucky.

References

1932 births
2017 deaths
Japanese basketball coaches
Japan national basketball team coaches
Japanese men's basketball players